American Southern Presbyterian Mission was an American Presbyterian missionary society of the Southern Presbyterian Church that was involved in sending workers to countries such as China during the late Qing Dynasty, Japan and Korea.  It was organized in 1862.

References

Notes

See also
Presbyterian Church in the United States
Protestant missionary societies in China during the 19th Century
Timeline of Chinese history
19th-century Protestant missions in China
List of Protestant missionaries in China
Christianity in China

Religious organizations established in 1862
Evangelical parachurch organizations
Christian missions in China
 American Southern Presbyterian Mission
1862 establishments in the Confederate States of America